Atrocities committed during the Spanish Civil War may refer to:

Red Terror (Spain), Atrocities committed by the Republican side.
White Terror (Spain), Atrocities committed by the Nationalist side.